Androcalva tatei, commonly known as trailing commersonia, is a small shrub that is endemic to Australia. The species occurs in the states of South Australia and Victoria, where it is endangered.

References

Flora of South Australia
Flora of Victoria (Australia)
tatei